Jason of the Argonauts, an ancient Greek mythological hero, appears often in popular culture.

Film

The 1958 Italian production of Hercules starring Steve Reeves, featured the characters of Jason (played by Fabrizio Mioni) and the Argonauts, as well as Ulysses (played by Gabriele Antonini).
The 1960 Italian-French film, The Giants of Thessaly, is loosely based on the epic poem Argonautica by Apollonius Rhodius. Jason is played by Roland Carey.
Two movies titled Jason and the Argonauts have been produced: Jason and the Argonauts (1963), directed by Don Chaffey, and Jason and the Argonauts (2000), a Hallmark TV movie.
Lars Von Trier's made for TV movie entitled Medea (1988) depicts Udo Kier as Jason after he has retrieved the Golden Fleece.
"Jason and the Golden Fleece," episode 4 of the 2005 documentary, In Search of Myths and Heroes by Michael Wood, explores the Jason myth.
Michael Eisner's 2008 web show, All-for-nots, is loosely based on the Argonautika, as it follows an indie rock band whose Argonaut-sounding name is The All-for-nots (itself a pun on "all for naught") who tour America on their way to the "golden fleece" of rock stardom.
Episode 2 of the 2008 TV series Age of the Gods: Journeys Edition, titled "Jason", is based on the myth of Jason and relates the stories of King Pelias, the Argonauts, the Isles of Lemnos, Phineus and the Harpies, the Symplegades, Medea, the Iron Bulls and Sown Men, the Golden Fleece, the Betrayal of Medea, and the Death of Jason.

Literature
"Jason's Voyage" is the title of Book Five of Thomas Wolfe's autobiographical 1935 novel Of Time and the River.
The Golden Fleece (1944 UK version; aka Hercules, My Shipmate, 1945 US version) written by Robert Graves, is a somewhat humorous account of Jason and the Argonauts. Graves sometimes gives "natural" explanations to some of the myths. At other times he includes new myths of his own.
The novel Jason (1961) by Henry Treece is narrated by Jason himself. The supernatural elements are largely removed, but a major theme of the book is the clash between the older religion of the mother goddess, favoured by women (who are portrayed as dangerous and hostile to men in many ways) and the newer religion of Zeus and Poseidon favoured by men.
The 2006 book The Sea of Monsters, by Rick Riordan, parallels Jason's story in many ways.
Jason Grace, a main character in the 2010 Heroes of Olympus series (also by Rick Riordan), was named after Jason.
The Heroes of Olympus features an Argo II made by Leo Valdez, appointed by Hera.
In comics, outside of a comic book adaptation of the film Jason and the Argonauts published by Dell Comics in 1963 as part of their Movie Classics series, there were 2 series that featured Jason and The Argonauts. The first was a 5 issue series published by Caliber Press in 1991, while the other was a series called Jason and the Argonauts: Kingdom of Hades, a 5 issue mini-series, published by Bluewater Comics in 2007. In 2011, Campfire Books published a graphic novel called Jason and the Argonauts written by Dan Whitehead.

Music
 Hip-hop duo Hermit and the Recluse (composed of rapper Ka and producer Animoss) released a 2018 album titled Orpheus vs. the Sirens, which utilizes mythical imagery from several episodes of the Argonauts' voyage.
 In 2001, a radio drama adaptation of Apollonius' Argonautica, was produced by the Radio Tales series for National Public Radio.
 "Birdhouse In Your Soul", a 1990 single from the They Might Be Giants album Flood, features references to Jason and the Argonauts.
"Jason and the Argonauts" is the title of a track on XTC's 1982 album, English Settlement.

Stage
Giasone is an opera in three acts and a prologue with music by Francesco Cavalli and a libretto by Giacinto Andrea Cicognini. It was premiered at the Teatro San Cassiano, Venice on 5 January 1649.
Mary Zimmerman wrote and directed Argonautika, which premiered in 2006 with the Chicago Lookingglass Theatre Company. It tells the story of Jason and the Argonauts from Pelias' initial charge through Jason's betrayal of Medea.
Euripides wrote the play Medea, which depicts Medea killing Jason's bride and their two children. This play has nine characters and a chorus role.

Television
 Jason is played by Jeffrey Thomas on Hercules: The Legendary Journeys and in flashback episodes and in Young Hercules by Chris Conrad.
 Jason is portrayed in the BBC One series Atlantis by Jack Donnelly. In the series, he was born in Atlantis but emigrated to the world of the 21st Century with his father when he was a child.
 Jason is voiced by William Shatner in Disney's Hercules: The Animated Series in a performance parodying Star Treks Captain Kirk.
 In the 2005 children's series Class of the Titans, one of the main characters, Jay, is a descendant of Jason, and the characters have run-ins with Medea and Talos.

Video games
Jason is an antagonist of the Okeanos singularity in Fate/Grand Order. During the game's 4th Anniversary Event in 2019, he has been added as a 1-star Saber Servant alongside other Bronze Servants.
Jason is briefly featured in the 2007 video game God of War II. He has taken the Argonauts to the Isle of Creation, and has made it as far as Euryale's temple, where they were overcome by a cursed Cerberus. As Kratos walks into the monster's dungeon, Jason has been eaten alive and the Golden Fleece is hanging out of the creature's jaws. After Kratos kills the Cerberus, he takes the Golden Fleece, which is interpreted as a golden arm-long gauntlet, as his own, which becomes a permanent addition to his character throughout the rest of God of War II and all of God of War III.
 Jason is a playable character in Herc's Adventures.
 Codemasters released Rise of the Argonauts, an action role-playing video game developed by Liquid Entertainment, in 2008. The game was loosely based on the mythology, telling a new version of Jason's search for the Golden Fleece with many changes to both characters and events.
Jason is one of the heroes in the 2002 Age of Mythology.
In the Age of Empires, Jason featured as a khopesh swordsman and an axeman.

See Also

 Jason (given name)

References

Popular culture
Classical mythology in popular culture